Sophie Brundish (born c.1974) in athletics is an English artistic gymnast who has competed in British Championship competitions as well as succeeding at junior and senior levels. She is also three times Bexley Youth Games Champion.

Career
She has also won 30 medals and trophies from various competitions, including competitions abroad (Russia, United States, Malta, Belgium and Switzerland). Sophie Brundish is a member of the Europa Gymnastics Club.

In 2017, at age 23 Brundish beat her personal best at the FINA High Diving World Cup 2017 with 115.75 points.

Sophie is best known for her participation in a television advert for the Panasonic Smart Viera TV model.

See also

References

External links
Panasonic SMART VIERA TV - UK TV advert

Living people
British female artistic gymnasts
Year of birth missing (living people)